Risko is a surname. Notable people with the surname include:

Eddie Babe Risko (1911–1957), Lithuanian-Polish-American boxer
Robert Risko (born 1956), American caricature artist

See also
Riske

Hungarian-language surnames